Guglielmotti was the name of at least two ships of the Italian Navy and may refer to:

 , a  launched in 1916 and sunk in 1917.
 , a   launched in 1938 and sunk in 1942.

Italian Navy ship names